Unión Sabá is a Honduran football club based in Sabá, Honduras.

Football clubs in Honduras